Symphony No. 8 is a composition by the Brazilian composer Heitor Villa-Lobos, written in 1950. A performance lasts about 25 minutes

History
Villa-Lobos composed his Eighth Symphony in Rio de Janeiro in 1950. It was first performed at Carnegie Hall in New York on 14 January 1955 by the Philadelphia Orchestra, conducted by the composer. The European premiere took place shortly afterward, on 15 March 1955 at the Salle Gaveau in Paris. The performers were the Orchestra of the Concert Society of the Paris Conservatory, conducted by the composer. The score is dedicated to the New York Times music critic Olin Downes.

Instrumentation
The symphony is scored for an orchestra consisting of 2 piccolos, 2 flutes, 2 oboes, cor anglais, 2 clarinets, bass clarinet, 2 bassoons, contrabassoon, 4 horns, 4 trumpets, 4 trombones, tuba, timpani, tam-tam, cymbals, xylophone, celesta, 2 harps, piano, and strings.

Analysis
The symphony has four movements
 Andante
 Lento (assai)
 Allegretto scherzando
 Allegro (giusto)

This is according to Villa-Lobos, sua obra and Latin American Music Center. The liner card and electronic track listing for the CPO CD of the work (CPO 999 517-2) gives:
 Andante – Allegro – Tempo I
 Lento assai
 Allegro giusto
 Molto allegro

With the exception of the expanded listing of the first movement, however, the booklet accompanying the CD agrees with the two Villa-Lobos catalogues. Enyart gives a slightly different version, with the Portuguese spelling, justo, in place of the Italian giusto in the last movement:
 Andante – Allegro
 Lento
 Allegretto scherzando
 Allegro justo

References

Cited sources

Further reading
 Béhague, Gerard. 1994. Villa-Lobos: The Search for Brazil's Musical Soul. Austin: Institute of Latin American Studies, University of Texas at Austin, 1994. .
 Béhague, Gerard. 2001. "Heitor Villa-Lobos' Symphonies No. 6 and No. 8, and Suite pour cordes". Booklet accompanying Heitor Villa-Lobos: Symphonies 6 & 8, 16–24 (also in German and French translations, 4–13 and 27–36, respectively). SWR Radio-Sinfonieorchester Stuttgart, Carl St. Clair, cond. Recorded 17–21 February 1997 and 18 April 2000, Stadthallle Sindelfingen. CD recording. 1 disc, 12 cm, stereo. CPO 999 517-2.
 Salles, Paulo de Tarso. 2009. Villa-Lobos: processos composicionais. Campinas, SP: Editora da Unicamp. .

Symphonies by Heitor Villa-Lobos
1950 compositions
Music with dedications